Bösenburg is a village in the Mansfeld-Südharz rural district in the German state of Saxony-Anhalt. Through Bösenburg flows the stream Fleischbach.

Former municipalities in Saxony-Anhalt
Gerbstedt